Vincent Mendy  (born 22 January 1988, in Paris) is a French football defensive midfielder.

Career

FK SIAD Most
Mendy made his professional league debut at the age of 19, on 1 April 2007, starting for FK SIAD Most in a 0-0 draw with FK Teplice during the 2006-07 season of the Gambrinus liga, the top league in the Czech Republic.

Mendy made 12 career Gambrinus liga appearances between 2006 and 2008.

SK Hlavice
On 18 February 2010, he left FK SIAD Most and joined for a six-month loan deal to SK Hlavice.

Personal life
Vincent is the younger brother of Alexandre Mendy, a midfielder for 1.FC Saarbrücken in Germany. Mendy is of Senegalese descent.

References

External links

1988 births
Living people
French footballers
French sportspeople of Senegalese descent
French expatriate footballers
Footballers from Paris
Czech First League players
AC Sparta Prague players
FK Baník Most players
Expatriate footballers in the Czech Republic
FC Versailles 78 players
Association football midfielders
Ethnikos Piraeus F.C. players
Expatriate footballers in Greece